Jemimah Sanyu, also known as the Stage Gladiator, is a Ugandan musician, performer, producer, and voice coach. She has a commanding stage presence with a very strong voice. Sanyu has met people like President Yoweri Museveni while singing at the I am a Ugandan album premier. She has shared a stage with top African stars like Habib Koite, Navio, Joanita Kawalya of Afrigo Band, and Juliana Kanyomozi. and many other African stars.

Sanyu peaked at #4 on the HiPipo charts with her hit single Ziba Amaaso in the fifth week of 2012. Her other charting hits included I am a Ugandan peaking at #8 and Kankusute at #17,  both on the HiPipo charts in 2011. All of her charting songs gained good radio air play.

Music
Sanyu, a two-time Diva Awards nominee, started doing music professionally in 2007 when she joined Grayce Records. Sanyu experienced a meteoric rise as a music star of Afro pop melodies and dance music mostly because of her strong and wild live performances and her voice. She hosts a music night dubbed Sanyu Talks at Jazzville Bugolobi every Thursday accompanied by her band UNIT 446.

Sanyu was one of the divas chosen to perform at the Serena Hotel the Qwela Junction, dubbed the "Divas' Junction", alongside veteran singer and one of Afrigo Band’s lead vocalists Rachael Magoola, Solome, Rita Sabiiti, Naava Grey, Maureen Rutabingwa, and Sandra Suubi. She mesmerized the audience by dancing atop tables, a stunt known as a Bebe after Bebe Cool did it at a Miss Uganda beauty pageant event.

Jemimah Sanyu was a member of Janzi Band from 2010 to 2012 as their lead vocalist after leaving Zawee Band as a backup singer.

Discography
Sanyu has performed live all across Africa, including festivals and corporate events. She has also recorded an eight track studio album Amaaso go googera, which immediately ensured her status as a star on East Africa’s music scene.

Albums
Amaaso go googera

Songs
The songs include;
Ziba amaaso
Sitya
I am a Ugandan
This Love
Yakubedha
Amaaso go googera

Live performances
Sanyu has performed on many stages to entertain people. She has performed all across Africa, including but not limited to Uganda, Rwanda, Ethiopia, Kenya, and Tanzania.

Sanyu was selected to perform on World Music Day 2015 in Uganda alongside Undercover Brothers Ug, Sandy Soul, and Ruyonga.

Sanyu has performed at:
DoaDoa
Selam Festival Ethiopia
Bayimba Festival Uganda 2014
World Music Day Uganda 2015
Sondeka (Kenya)
Visa for Music

Personal life
Jemimah has been dating her producer Legend P and the two welcomed a baby girl in March 2017. Jemimah had been performing at her weekly shows at Sheraton Hotel and Serena Kyigo and other stages while heavily pregnant until she got into labour.

Nominations and awards

See also
List of Ugandan musicians
Isaiah Katumwa
Giovanni Kiyingi  
Suzan Kerunen

References

External links 

"Doadoa spreads wings to Jinja"
All-female line-up for Uganda’s Qwela Junction November concert
Visa For Music, une plateforme inédite pour booster la création musicale de l’Afrique et du Moyen-Orient
Interview: Uganda's Jemimah Sanyu ready to take on the world

1986 births
Living people
People from Kampala
Makerere University alumni
21st-century Ugandan women singers
Janzi Band members